Narayan Sen (1912–1956) was a Bengali revolutionary in the Indian independence movement. He was born in British India, present-day Bangladesh. His father's name was Sureshcharan Sen.

Education
Narayan Sen was born in Bogra district of Bangladesh on 1912. After passing his matriculation exam he came to his maternal grandparents house at Chittagong. Then Chittagong was the center point of the revolutionary activities of Masterda Surya Sen. Narayan Sen joined with the revolutionary team.

Revolutionary activities
Surya Sen led a group of revolutionaries on 18 April 1930 to raid the police and auxiliary forces armouries in Chittagong. Narayan Sen took part in the attack. The plan was elaborate and included seizing of arms from the armouries as well as destruction of communication system of the city (including telephone, telegraph and railway), thereby isolating Chittagong from the rest of British India. Although the group looted weapons, they failed to get ammunition. They hoisted the Indian National Flag on the premises of the armoury, and then escaped. A few days later, a large fraction of the revolutionary group was cornered on Jalalabad Hill by British troops. In the ensuing fight, twelve revolutionaries died, many were arrested, while some managed to flee, including Narayan Sen. Police then declared 500 taka for Narayan Sen but failed to capture him.

Death
Eighteen years Sen lives here and there with different looks and different names, Then he returns at Kolkata and live by the fake name Onath Roy. Nobody knew his real name. He discloses his real identity at 12 January 1948 at the death anniversary of Surya Sen. He died at 8 September 1956.

References

Indian revolutionaries
1956 deaths
1912 births
Indian independence activists from West Bengal